Stephen DeStefano (born 1966) is an American comics artist, animator and storyboard artist best known as the co-creator of 'Mazing Man and Hero Hotline with writer Bob Rozakis.

Early life
DeStefano was born in Jamaica, Queens, New York and attended the High School of Art and Design.

Career
DeStefano's first credit in the comics industry was as the creator of the characters Zeep and Thumbelina in the "Dial H for Hero" story in Adventure Comics #483 (July 1981). His first professionally published comics artwork was a one-page parody of the "I…Vampire" feature in House of Mystery #306 (July 1982). DeStefano wrote and drew "The Mini (Mis)Adventures of Nick O. Tyme" in New Talent Showcase #6–12 (June–December 1984). He then teamed with writer Bob Rozakis to create 'Mazing Man, a character introduced in an eponymous series beginning in January 1986. After the cancellation of that series, the Rozakis-DeStefano team created Hero Hotline in Action Comics Weekly #637 (January 1989). After a four-issue run as a back-up feature, Hero Hotline received its own six-issue limited series. In the 1990s, DeStefano was a frequent contributor to The Big Book Of series published by Paradox Press. His other comics work includes credits at Dark Horse Comics, Disney Comics, Fantagraphics Books, and Marvel Comics. As an animator, DeStefano has worked on such series as The Ren & Stimpy Show and Futurama. He inked the Cage limited series drawn by Genndy Tartakovsky in 2016–2017. In 2020, DeStefano won the Outstanding Individual Achievement in Animation Emmy for Character Design on the Genndy Tartakovsky series, "Primal".

Filmography

Television

As voice actor

Film

Bibliography
Apple Comics
 101 Other Uses for a Condom #1 (1991)

Dark Horse Comics
 Cheval Noir #26, 44 (1992–1993)
 Hellboy, Jr. #1–2 (1999)
 Hellboy, Jr., Halloween Special #1 (1997)
 Instant Piano #1–4 (1994–1995)
 Wolf & Red #2 (1995)

DC Comics

 Action Comics Weekly #637–640 ("Hero Hotline" feature) (1989)
 Billy Batson and the Magic of Shazam! #6 (2009)
 Bizarro Comics #1 (2001)
 Blackhawk vol. 3 #3–4 (1989)
 The Brave and the Bold #200 (one page) (1983)
 Cartoon Cartoons #16, 22–23, 32 (2003–2004)
 Cartoon Network Action Pack #7 (2007)
 Cartoon Network Block Party #3 (2005)
 Cool World #1–4 (movie adaptation) (1992)
 Dexter's Laboratory #11, 30 (2000–2002)
 Elvira's House of Mystery Special #1 (1987)
 Fast Forward #2 (1993)
 The Flash Secret Files and Origins #2 (1999)
 Flintstones and the Jetsons #4 (1997)
 Hero Hotline #1–6 (1989)
 House of Mystery #306, 311, 313–315, 321 (1982–1983)
 Just Imagine Stan Lee... Secret Files and Origins #1 (one page) (2002)
 Legion #9 (2002)
 Looney Tunes #100, 150 (2003–2007)
 Looney Tunes Magazine #6 (1991)
 'Mazing Man #1–12 (1986)
 'Mazing Man Special #1–3 (1987–1990)
 New Talent Showcase #6–12 (1984)
 Scooby-Doo #28–29, 45, 77, 79 (1999–2004)
 Secret Origins vol. 2 #16 ('Mazing Man), #30 (Plastic Man), #34 (G'nort) (1987–1988)
 Superman and Batman: World's Funnest #1 (2001)
 Superman Villains Secret Files and Origins #1 (1998)
 Sweatshop #1–3 (2003)
 Wednesday Comics HC (one page) (2010)
 Who's Who in the DC Universe #8 (1991)
 Who's Who in the Legion of Super-Heroes #3 (1988)
 Who's Who: The Definitive Directory of the DC Universe #7, 13, 15–16 (1985–1986)
 Who's Who Update '88 #1 (1988)

Paradox Press
 The Big Book of Bad (1998)
 The Big Book of Little Criminals (1996)
 The Big Book of Scandal (1997)
 The Big Book of Urban Legends (1994)
 The Big Book of Vice (1999)

Disney Comics
 Disney Adventures #97–1, #97–8 (1997)
 Walt Disney's Mickey Mouse Adventures #1–2, 7–11 (1990–1991)

Fantagraphics Books
 Critters #32, 38, 50 (1989–1990)
 Itchy Planet #3 (one page) (1988)

Harvey Pekar
 American Splendor #14 (1989)

Marvel Comics
 Bill & Ted's Bogus Journey #1 (movie adaptation) (1991)
 Bill & Ted's Excellent Comic Book #1–3 (1991–1992)
 Cage #1–4 (2016–2017)
 Video Jack #4, 6 (1988)

NBM Publishing
 Classics Desecrated (1995)

Oni Press
 Jingle Belle #1–2 (1999)
 Oni Double Feature #13 (1999)
 Oni Press Summer Vacation Supercolor Fun Special #1 (2000)
 Paul Dini's Jingle Belle Winter Wingding #1 (2002)
 Paul Dini's Jingle Belle's All-Star Holiday Hullabaloo #1 (2000)

Palliard Press
 XXXenophile #6 (1992)

Renegade Press
 Renegade Romance #1–2 (1987–1988)

United Plankton Pictures, Inc.
 SpongeBob Comics #4–5, 34, 43 (2011–2015)

References

External links

 Stephen DeStefano on Twitter
 
 Stephen DeStefano at Mike's Amazing World of Comics
 Stephen DeStefano at the Unofficial Handbook of Marvel Comics Creators
Stephen DeStefano papers at Columbia University. Rare Book & Manuscript Library

1966 births
20th-century American artists
21st-century American artists
American comics artists
American comics writers
American male voice actors
American storyboard artists
American writers of Italian descent
Animators from New York (state)
Artists from New York City
Comics inkers
DC Comics people
High School of Art and Design alumni
Living people
Marvel Comics people
People from Jamaica, Queens